Rudd Field is the home of the UMass men's and women's soccer teams.

The facility opened September 8, 2002. The field includes a 120 by 75 yard sand-based natural turf playing surface. Funding for the field was made possible by a commitment from the Rudd Family Foundation.

References

College soccer venues in the United States
UMass Minutemen soccer
University of Massachusetts Amherst buildings
Soccer venues in Massachusetts
Sports venues completed in 2002
2002 establishments in Massachusetts